The 2013 Formula BMW Talent Cup was the third and final Formula BMW Talent Cup season.

Drivers

Race calendar

Championship standings

References

 Formula BMW Talent Cup - Grand Final 2013 driverdb.com

External links
 BMW-Motorsport.com

Formula BMW seasons
Formula BMW Talent Cup
Formula BMW Talent Cup
Formula BMW Talent Cup
BMW Talent Cup